Martinus Novianto Ardhi (born 4 November 1995) is an Indonesian professional footballer who plays as a striker for Liga 2 club Deltras.

Club career 
On 13 January 2015, Martinus signed a one-year contract with Bali United to commence ahead of the 2015 Indonesia Super League.
He made his debut on 4 April 2015, as starting line-up, which ended 2–1 defeat against Perseru Serui.

International career 
Martinus has represented Indonesia from under-19 to under-21 level.

Career statistics

Club

References

External links 
 
 Martinus Novianto at Liga Indonesia

1995 births
Indonesian footballers
Liga 1 (Indonesia) players
Bali United F.C. players
People from Gunung Kidul Regency
Association football forwards
Living people